Formosat-1 (福爾摩沙衛星一號, formerly known as ROCSAT-1) is an Earth observation satellite operated by the National Space Program Office (NSPO, now the National Space Organization) of the Republic of China (Taiwan) to conduct observations of the ionosphere and oceans. The spacecraft and its instrumentation were developed jointly by NSPO and TRW using TRW's Lightsat bus, and was launched from Cape Canaveral Air Force Station, US, by Lockheed Martin on January 27, 1999. FormoSat-1 provided 5½ years of operational service. The spacecraft ended its mission on June 17, 2004 and was decommissioned on July 16, 2004.

Technical details

Spacecraft
Weight: 401 kg
Shape: Hexagonal
Dimensions
Height: 2.1 m
Diameter: 1.1 m
Solar arrays: Two, 1.16 x 2.46 m
Electrical power: 450 watts

Instrumentation
Experimental Communication Payload (ECP)
Ionosphere Plasma Electrodynamics Instrument (IPEI)
Ocean Color Imager (OCI)

Orbit
Altitude: 600 km
Type: Circular
Inclination: 35 degrees

See also

FORMOSAT-2
FORMOSAT-3/COSMIC

References

External links
ROCSAT-1 at GlobalSecurity

Earth observation satellites of Taiwan
Spacecraft launched in 1999
First artificial satellites of a country